Burges is a surname. Notable people with the surname include:

Alan Burges (1911–2002), Australian botanist
Anthony Burges (or Burgess; d. 1664), English Nonconformist clergyman
Cornelius Burges (1589?–1665), English minister
Daniel Burges (1873–1946), British soldier
Dempsey Burges (1751–1800), US Representative from North Carolina
George Burges (1786–1864), British classical scholar
James Burges a.k.a. Sir James Lamb, 1st Baronet (1752–1824), British author, lawyer, and politician
John Burges (or Burgess; 1563–1635), English clergyman and physician
John Smith-Burges, 1st Baronet Smith-Burges (c. 1734–1803), an official of the British East India Company
Judy Burges (b. 1943), member of the Arizona State Senate
Lockier Burges (Australian politician) (1814–1886), Australian politician
Lockier Burges (1841-1929), Australian explorer, entrepreneur, and author
Mary Anne Burges (1763–1813), British writer
Richard Fenner Burges (1873–1945), Texan attorney, legislator, and conservationist
Tristam Burges (1770–1853), US Representative from Rhode Island
William Burges (1827–1881), English architect
William Burges (politician) (c.1807–1876), Australian politician
 Michala Burges (b. 1995), American researcher and physician

See also
 Burgess (disambiguation)
Bruges (disambiguation)